The discography of Puerto Rican rapper, singer-songwriter and producer Daddy Yankee has released eight studio albums, two live albums, eighty-nine singles, and one soundtrack. He made his debut on DJ Playero's Playero 34 mixtape, released in 1991. He was later featured on Playero's 37 and 38 albums, before releasing his first solo record in 1995, titled No Mercy. During the rest of the 1990s, he continued working on underground reggaeton records and released his first album as producer El Cartel de Yankee in 1997. After the release of his 2001 independent album El Cartel II: Los Cangris, he released his second studio album, El Cangri.com, in June 2002. It is cited as the record that made him notorious outside his natal Puerto Rico, being his music introduced in New York City and Miami. Without any major label backing him, El Cangri.com managed to peak at number 43 on the US Top Latin Albums chart. A track from the album, "Brugal Mix", became his first Billboard chart entry by peaking at number 40 on the US Tropical Songs chart in November 2002.

He later released Los Homerun-es in 2003, a compilation album that features re-recorded Playero mixtape tracks, which peaked at number 158 in the United States and at number seven on the US Top Latin Albums chart. Barrio Fino, his third studio album, was released in July 2004 and became the first reggaeton record to debut and peak at number one on the US Top Latin Albums chart. It was later certified platinum by the Recording Industry Association of America. Barrio Fino is cited as the album that introduced reggaeton into the mainstream market and became the best selling Latin album of the 2000s decade in the United States. The success of its lead single "Gasolina" led to the creation of a new radio format in the United States named Latin Rhythm Airplay. A follow-up live album, titled Barrio Fino en Directo, was released in December 2005 and spent fourteen weeks at the top of the US Top Latin Albums, subsequently receiving a gold certification.

His fourth studio album El Cartel: The Big Boss (2007) became his first top ten entry in the United States by peaking at number nine and earned a triple platinum (Latin) certification by the RIAA. Its singles "Impacto" and "Ella Me Levantó" both peaked at number two on the US Hot Latin Songs chart. Talento de Barrio, a soundtrack for the namesake film, was released in August 2008. Mundial, his fifth studio album, was released in April 2010. His sixth studio album Prestige was released in September 2012 and includes the US Latin number one singles "Lovumba" and "Limbo". A mixtape titled King Daddy was released in October 2013 and became the first digital-only album to rank within the top ten on the US Top Latin Albums chart.

In 2017, Daddy Yankee was featured on Luis Fonsi's single "Despacito", which topped the charts in 47 countries, including the United States, the United Kingdom, and Canada, aided by a remix version featuring Justin Bieber. It became the first primarily Spanish-language song to peak at number one on the Billboard Hot 100 since 1996 and topped the chart for 16 weeks, tying with "One Sweet Day" by Mariah Carey and Boyz II Men as the longest-reigning number-one single in the chart's history. The song also became the longest-reigning number one on the Billboard Hot Latin Songs chart with 52 weeks and the longest-reigning foreign language number one in the United Kingdom with 11 weeks. Its success led Daddy Yankee to become the most listened artist worldwide on the streaming service Spotify in June 2017, being the first Latin artist to do so.

As of October 2017, Barrio Fino and Barrio Fino en Directo are the seventh and 13th best selling Latin albums in the United States, respectively. During his career, Daddy Yankee hit 67 entries on the US Hot Latin Songs chart, from which six peaked at number one, 18 reached the top five, and 28 ranked within the top 10. He is the sixth artist with most top 10 singles on Hot Latin Songs, as well as the one with most entries. On the Billboard Hot 100, he charted 13 titles, including a number-one peak and five top 40 singles.

Albums

Studio albums

Compilations

Live albums

Other albums

Singles

As lead artist

On January 12, 2017, Billboard updated its methodology for the Tropical Songs chart to exclude any songs that do not fit in the tropical music category.

As featured artist

Other charted and promotional songs

Other credits

Music videos

Notes
Sales figures

Charts

References

External links
Daddy Yankee's official website

Daddy Yankee at ASCAP

discography
Reggaeton discographies
Hip hop discographies
Discographies of Puerto Rican artists